John Alfred Brashear (November 24, 1840 – April 8, 1920) was an American astronomer and instrument builder.

Life and work 

Brashear was born in Brownsville, Pennsylvania, a town 35 miles (56 km) south of Pittsburgh along the Monongahela River. His father, Basil Brown Brashear, was a saddler, and his mother, Julia Smith Brashear, was a school teacher. He was the oldest of seven children. As a boy, John Brashear was heavily influenced by his maternal grandfather, Nathanial Smith, a clock repairer.  When he was nine, his grandfather took him to view through the telescope of 'Squire' Joseph P. Wampler, who set up his traveling telescope in Brownsville. That influential view of the moon and the planet Saturn stayed with Brashear for the rest of his life. After receiving a common school education until age 15, he became an apprentice to a machinist and had mastered his trade at age 20.

Beginning in 1861 Brashear worked as a millwright in a rolling steel mill in Pittsburgh.  He  pursued his love for astronomy at night, with the help of his wife Phoebe Stewart, a Sunday school teacher whom Brashear met in 1861 and married in 1862. Of too little means to purchase a telescope, Brashear built his own workshop from a three-meter-square coal shed behind his house and proceeded to build his own refractor.

Starting in 1880, he dedicated his time to manufacture astronomical as well as scientific instruments, and performed various experiments. He developed an improved silvering method, which would become the standard for coating first surface mirrors (known as the "Brashear Process") until vacuum metalizing began replacing it in 1932.

Brashear patented few instruments and never patented his techniques. He founded "John A. Brashear Co." with his son-in-law and partner, James Brown McDowell (now a division of L-3 Communications, and still based in Pittsburgh).  His instruments gained worldwide respect. Optical elements and instruments of precision produced by John Brashear were purchased for their quality by almost every important observatory in the world. Some are still in use today. A crew demolishing his factory found a time capsule that became an object of dispute.

In 1892 Brashear made his second of three trips to Europe, this time providing a lecture tour. In 1898 he became director of the Allegheny Observatory in Pittsburgh, continuing in this post until 1900.

From 1901 to 1904, he was acting chancellor of the Western University of Pennsylvania, now known as the University of Pittsburgh, after serving as a member of the board of trustees since 1896.  Brashear also was a trustee of the Carnegie Institute of Technology and served as President of the Academy of Science and Art.

John and Phoebe Brashear were active in their church as well. He served as the choir director of Bingham Street Methodist Episcopal Church, and organized the Cantata Society, composed of church choirs from Pittsburgh's South Side.  During the Panama-Pacific Exposition (1915), in which a 20" Warner-Swasey telescope with Brashear optics was displayed, Brashear was named "the State's most distinguished man" by Pennsylvania's Governor Martin Grove Brumbaugh. The telescope is still in use today at Chabot Space and Science Center at Oakland, California.

John Brashear was admired and beloved by fellow western Pennsylvanians and international astronomers, who familiarly called him "Uncle John".

In 1919, he suffered ptomaine poisoning (an outdated term for food poisoning), which induced a debilitating illness lasting six months. He died at age 79 at his home on Perrysville Avenue.  His body was held in state in the Great Hall of the Soldiers and Sailors Monument.

His ashes are interred in a crypt below the Keeler Telescope at Allegheny Observatory, along with those of his wife. A plaque on the crypt reads: "We have loved the stars too fondly to be fearful of the night.", a paraphrase of the last line of the poem "The Old Astronomer to His Pupil" by Sarah Williams. He was survived by a daughter and several siblings.

Honors

 In 1902, he was elected as a member of the American Philosophical Society.
He was awarded the Elliott Cresson Medal of The Franklin Institute in 1910.
 The Brashear Association was founded in 1916 in his memory.
 In 2012, the John A. Brashear House and Factory at 1954 Perrysville Avenue in the Perry South neighborhood of Pittsburgh was listed on the National Register of Historic Places.

Named for him:
 The crater Brashear on the Moon
 The crater Brashear on Mars
 Asteroid 5502 Brashear
 Brashear High School in Pittsburgh, Pennsylvania (1976)
 Brashear Street in Pittsburgh, Pennsylvania
 One of the telescopes at the Goodsell Observatory
 The Brashear 11-Inch Refractor at the Nicholas E. Wagman Observatory near Pittsburgh.

See also

 List of astronomical instrument makers
 Chabot Space & Science Center, Oakland, California

References

Further reading 

 - See also later reprints.
 Obituary notices:

External links
 "The Unexpected Hero of Light," Initial Condition podcast, Episode 9
 
 "John A. Brashear" History Cover Page
 "Uncle John" Brashear

Video
 Undaunted: The Forgotten Giants of the Allegheny Observatory
 WQED OnQ: John Brashear's Legacy

1840 births
1920 deaths
American astronomers
Scientists from Pittsburgh
American scientific instrument makers
American mechanical engineers
University of Pittsburgh faculty
Telescope manufacturers
People from Brownsville, Pennsylvania
Engineers from Pennsylvania